William Arthur Wade (25 March 1919 – 24 August 2014) was an Australian politician, elected as a member of the New South Wales Legislative Assembly.

Wade was born in the Newcastle suburb of  Carrington and educated at Carrington Public School and Broadmeadow High School.  During World War II he served in the Second Australian Imperial Force from 1939 in the 2/3 Field Regiment.  He was captured in 1941 and was a prisoner of war in Germany and Poland until the end of the war in 1945.  After the war he was a shopkeeper and married Heather Muncaster in August 1949 and they had two sons and one daughter.

Wade was an alderman on Newcastle City Council from 1947 to 1968, including a year as Deputy Lord Mayor in 1958.  He was a member of Shortland County Council (the local electricity retailer) from 1958 to 1968.  He was the Labor Party member for Newcastle from 1968 to 1988.

References

Members of the New South Wales Legislative Assembly
1919 births
2014 deaths
Australian military personnel of World War II
Australian Labor Party members of the Parliament of New South Wales